San Remo is a suburb of the Central Coast region of New South Wales, Australia. It is part of the  local government area and is home to Northlakes High School, which has over 1000 students, and the San Remo Neighbourhood Centre.

References

Suburbs of the Central Coast (New South Wales)